In Greek mythology, Amyclas refers to two individuals:
Amyclas, a mythical king of Sparta.
Amyclas, a Theban prince as the son of King Amphion and Niobe, daughter of Tantalus. He perished with his brothers and sisters in the massacre of Niobids. In other versions, however, he was presented as the only surviving male (with his sister Chloris). When Laius the rightful king of Thebes returned, he was exiled and fled to Sparta, where some say he founded Amyclae.

There is also an Amyclas in Roman epic:
In Lucan's Pharsalia (Book V), Caesar knocks on the door of a poor fisherman named Amyclas as he looks to cross the Adriatic. Dante mentions this scene in Paradiso, Canto XI.68.

Notes

References 

 Apollodorus, The Library with an English Translation by Sir James George Frazer, F.B.A., F.R.S. in 2 Volumes, Cambridge, MA, Harvard University Press; London, William Heinemann Ltd. 1921. ISBN 0-674-99135-4. Online version at the Perseus Digital Library. Greek text available from the same website.
M. Annaeus Lucanus. The Civil War; The Pharsalia of Lucan. Translated by Sir Edward Ridley. Longmans, Green, and Co., 1905. Online version available
Pausanias, Description of Greece with an English Translation by W.H.S. Jones, Litt.D., and H.A. Ormerod, M.A., in 4 Volumes. Cambridge, MA, Harvard University Press; London, William Heinemann Ltd. 1918. . Online version at the Perseus Digital Library
Pausanias, Graeciae Descriptio. 3 vols. Leipzig, Teubner. 1903.  Greek text available at the Perseus Digital Library.

Niobids
Princes in Greek mythology
Theban characters in Greek mythology